Lodger may refer to:

 Lodger, a person whose accommodation takes the form of lodging
 Lodger, in British English a person who rents a room or accessory dwelling unit in a private residence
 Lodger (album), a 1979 art rock album by David Bowie
 Lodger (British band), a short-lived supergroup comprising members of Powder, Supergrass, and Delicatessen
 Lodger (Finnish band), a Finnish indie rock band

See also
 The Lodger (disambiguation)